Nungnadda "Jib" Wannasuk (born 11 November 1989) is a Thai former professional tennis player.

Career
She earned her best result in the 2011 PTT Pattaya Open where she, as a qualifier, reached the second round. She lost to top seed Vera Zvonareva, 1–6, 5–7. Wannasuk fought hard as she was 1–6, 1–5 down.

Wannasuk won nine singles titles and 15 doubles titles on the ITF Women's Circuit. All of her singles titles are $10ks, and four of the doubles titles are $25ks. Her highest WTA rankings are 342 in singles, achieved on 10 June 2013, and 317 in doubles, set on 17 August 2009.

ITF finals

Singles (9–10)

Doubles (15–9)

References

External links
 
 

1989 births
Living people
Nungnadda Wannasuk
Nungnadda Wannasuk
Tennis players at the 2010 Asian Games
Universiade medalists in tennis
Nungnadda Wannasuk
Nungnadda Wannasuk
Southeast Asian Games medalists in tennis
Competitors at the 2007 Southeast Asian Games
Nungnadda Wannasuk
Nungnadda Wannasuk
Nungnadda Wannasuk
Medalists at the 2011 Summer Universiade
Nungnadda Wannasuk
Nungnadda Wannasuk